The Hôtel Dumay, a historic building in Toulouse, France, is a Renaissance hôtel particulier (palace) of the 16th century. It has been listed as an official historical monument by the French Ministry of Culture since June 21, 1950.
The Dumay hotel retains the name of the man who built it at the end of the 16th century, Antoine Dumay, a renowned physician, notably a doctor of Marguerite de Valois, Henri IV's first wife. It now houses the Museum of Old Toulouse.

Pictures

See also 
 Renaissance architecture of Toulouse

Bibliography 
 Guy Ahlsell de Toulza, Louis Peyrusse, Bruno Tollon, Hôtels et Demeures de Toulouse et du Midi Toulousain, Daniel Briand éditeur, Drémil Lafage, 1997

References

Houses completed in the 16th century
Dumay
Buildings and structures in Toulouse
Monuments historiques of Haute-Garonne
Renaissance architecture in Toulouse
Hôtels particuliers in Toulouse